Ruttonjee Hospital is a district general hospital in Wan Chai on Hong Kong Island in Hong Kong. It is affiliated with the Li Ka Shing Faculty of Medicine, at the University of Hong Kong, and provides clinical attachment opportunities for the university's medical students.

History

Centrally located in Wan Chai, the Ruttonjee Hospital is a recently redeveloped hospital with a history that goes back more than 140 years. It was founded on the Mount Shadwell, Wan Chai site which was formerly occupied by the "Royal Naval Hospital", which was severely damaged during the Second World War. 

In 1949, the "Ruttonjee Sanatorium" was set up with the support of Mr Jehangir Hormusjee Ruttonjee in memory of his daughter, Tehmi Ruttonjee-Desai, who died of tuberculosis in 1943. It was one of the main institutions specifically treating tuberculosis in Hong Kong. Development and expansion of the hospital was overseen by Sister Dr Mary Aquinas Monaghan, a missionary nun from Ireland.

It was converted into the "Ruttonjee Hospital", a 600-bed general hospital, in 1991 not only because the number of patients with tuberculosis had decreased, but also because patients are increasingly treated by out-patient chemotherapy. The hospital now provides a wide range of services to meet the requirements of the community.

Since reconstruction, the hospital has become an acute general hospital with general medical and surgical specialities. It does not, however, provide paediatric, obstetric or gynaecological cover. Its surgical department enjoys high acclaim as the Ruttonjee is the only hospital in Hong Kong to provide gender-reassignment operations. The geriatrics service has also developed in recent years in response to the ageing population of the Wan Chai district.

Services
24 hour Emergency Department
Anaesthesia
Cardiac and Intensive Care Unit
Radiology
Geriatrics
Infirmary and Rehabilitation Medicine
Orthopaedics and Traumatology
Palliative Care
Pathology
Respiratory Medicine
Surgery

Others
Cardiac and Pulmonary Rehabilitation Programme
Chaplaincy and Pastoral Care
Combined Endoscopy Unit
Community Geriatric Assessment
Electro-medical Diagnostic Unit
Geriatric Day Hospital
Health Resource Centre
Special Accommodation Ward
Specialist Out-patient Department
Volunteer Service

Controversy
On 31 March 2010, the Hong Kong High Court approved a settlement in the legal action brought by British author Martin Jacques over the death of his wife Harinder Veriah. She was hospitalised in Ruttonjee Hospital after an epileptic seizure on 1 January 2000 and died the following evening. The case seemed to expose racial prejudice and medical negligence by doctors and staff.

See also
 Seaman's Hospital
 HMS Tamar

References

External links

Queen's Road East
Hospitals in Hong Kong
Wan Chai
Military of Hong Kong under British rule
Hospitals established in 1991
Tuberculosis sanatoria
1991 establishments in Hong Kong